"Aullando" (English: "Howling") is the fourth single of the Puerto Rican duo Wisin & Yandel,  alongside Dominican-American bachata singer Romeo Santos, from their album Los Campeones del Pueblo: The Big Leagues. The single was a massive success across Latin America.

Music video
A music video was released on February 14, 2019 to support the single. It was directed by Dominican filmmaker Jessy Terrero, who had directed numerous videoclips for Wisin & Yandel in the past. The video was shot at El San Juan Hotel in Puerto Rico and stars Wisin, Yandel, and Romeo Santos. The video makes numerous references to werewolves as a woman in a fur coat and bikini is transformed into a wolf while a full moon shines on the horizon. The music video has over 300 million views as of July 2019.

Live performances
Wisin & Yandel and Romeo Santos performed "Aullando" at the 2019 Billboard Latin Music Awards on April 25, 2019.

Charts

Weekly charts

Year-end charts

Certifications

See also
List of Billboard number-one Latin songs of 2019

References 

2019 singles
Reggaeton songs
Romeo Santos songs
Spanish-language songs
Sony Music Latin singles
Wisin & Yandel songs
Songs written by Wisin
Songs written by Yandel
Songs written by Romeo Santos
Songs written by Descemer Bueno
2018 songs
Music videos directed by Jessy Terrero